Adeimantus may refer to:

Adeimantus of Collytus, elder brother of Ancient Greek philosopher Plato
Adeimantus of Corinth, Greek commander at the Battle of Salamis in 480 BC
Adeimantus (son of Leucolophides), one of the commanders with Alcibiades in his expedition against Andros in 407 BC

Greek masculine given names